Wilfred David Trotter,  (born 25 July 1951) is a British academic specialising in the literature and cinema of 20th century Britain.

Trotter was Quain Professor of English Language and Literature at University College London from 1991 to 2002, and then the King Edward VII Professor of English Literature at the University of Cambridge and a fellow of Gonville and Caius College from 2002 to 2018.

Honours
In 2004, Trotter was elected Fellow of the British Academy (FBA).

References

 

 
 

Living people
Fellows of Gonville and Caius College, Cambridge
Fellows of the British Academy
1951 births
King Edward VII Professors of English Literature
Academics of University College London